The St. Nicholas Historic District, known colloquially as "Striver's Row", is a historic district located on both sides of West 138th and West 139th Streets between Adam Clayton Powell Jr. Boulevard (Seventh Avenue) and Frederick Douglass Boulevard (Eighth Avenue) in the Harlem neighborhood of Manhattan, New York City.  It is both a national and a New York City district, and consists of row houses and associated buildings designed by three architectural firms and built in 1891–93 by developer David H. King Jr.  These are collectively recognized as gems of New York City architecture, and "an outstanding example of late 19th-century urban design":

There are three sets of buildings:

the red brick and brownstone buildings on the south (even-numbered) side of West 138th Street and at 2350–2354 Adam Clayton Powell Jr. Boulevard were designed by James Brown Lord in the Georgian Revival style;
the yellow brick and white limestone with terra cotta trim buildings on the north (odd-numbered) side of 138th and on the south (even-numbered) side of 139th Street and at 2360–2378 Adam Clayton Powell Jr. Boulevard were designed in the Colonial Revival style by Bruce Price and Clarence S. Luce;
the dark brick, brownstone and terra cotta buildings on the north (odd-numbered) side of 139th Street and at 2380 Adam Clayton Powell Jr. Boulevard were designed in the Italian Renaissance Revival style by Stanford White of the firm McKim, Mead & White.

The district was designated by the New York City Landmarks Preservation Commission in 1967, and was listed on the National Register of Historic Places in 1975. The district's name reflects the nearby St. Nicholas Park.

History

David H. King Jr., the developer of what came to be called "Striver's Row", had previously been responsible for building the 1870 Equitable Building, the 1889 New York Times Building, the version of Madison Square Garden designed by Stanford White, and the Statue of Liberty's base.  The townhouses in his new project, which were originally called the "King Model Houses", were intended for upper-middle-class whites, and featured modern amenities, dark woodwork, and views of City College. King's idea was that the project would be "on such a large scale and with such ample resources as to 'Create a Neighborhood' independent of surrounding influences."

The houses sit back-to-back, which allowed King to specify that they would share rear courtyards. The alleyways between them – a rarity in Manhattan – are gated off; some entrance gates still have signs that read "Walk Your Horses". At one time, these alleys allowed discreet stabling of horses and delivery of supplies without disrupting activities in the main houses. Today, the back areas are used almost exclusively for parking.

King sold very few houses and the development failed, with Equitable Life Assurance Society, which had financed the project, foreclosing on almost all the units in 1895, during an economic depression. By this time, Harlem was being abandoned by white New Yorkers, yet the company would not sell the King houses to blacks, and so they sat empty until 1919–20, when they were finally made available to African Americans for $8,000 each.  Some of the units were turned into rooming houses, but generally they attracted both leaders of the black community and upwardly-mobile professionals, or "strivers", who gave the district its colloquial name.

Between Seventh and Eighth Avenues, is 139th Street, known among Harlemites as 'strivers' row.' It is the most aristocratic street in Harlem. Stanford White designed the houses for a wealthy white clientele. Moneyed African-Americans now own and inhabit them. When one lives on 'strivers' row' one has supposedly arrived. Harry Rills resides there, as do a number of the leading Babbitts and professional folk of Harlem.

By the 1940s, many of the houses had decayed and were converted to single room occupancies (SROs). Much of the original decorative detail inside the houses was lost at this time, though the exteriors generally remained unaltered. With the post-1995 real-estate boom in Harlem, many of these buildings are being restored to something resembling their original condition.

Notable residents
Among those who lived on Striver's Row were:

 Eubie Blake, composer, lyricist, and pianist
 Alvin Bragg, attorney and politician
 Will Marion Cook, composer
 Stepin Fetchit, comic actor
 W. C. Handy, composer
 Fletcher Henderson, bandleader and arranger
 Harry Pace, founder of Black Swan Records
 William Pickens, orator, educator, journalist, and essayist
 Adam Clayton Powell Jr., preacher and congressman
 Bill "Bojangles" Robinson, tap dancer and actor 
 Noble Sissle, composer
 Vertner Tandy, architect
 Harry Wills, heavyweight boxer
 Louis T. Wright, brain surgeon

In popular culture
Jazz saxophonist Sonny Rollins, a Harlem native, named a contrafact of Charlie Parker's "Confirmation" after Striver's Row. The piece appears on the 1958 album A Night At The Village Vanguard.
Jazz singer Cab Calloway mentions Striver's Row in his songs "Hard Times (Topsy Turvy)"  and "The Ghost of Smokey Joe".
Abram Hill's 1940 satirical comedy of manners On Strivers Row, produced with the American Negro Theatre (ANT), concerns "the follies of both social climbing and subtle racism among African Americans during Harlem's Renaissance".
 The Row is mentioned in the song "Harlem Blues" on the soundtrack to Spike Lee's 1990 film Mo' Better Blues.
Strivers Row is the name for Penguin Random House publishing imprint created to elevate African-American writers.
 One of the chapters of Colson Whitehead's 2001 novel John Henry Days is set on Striver's Row in the early 1940s.
Striver's Row, A Novel (2006) by Kevin Baker. This is the third book in Baker's trilogy of historical novels that take place in early 20th-century Harlem. Striver's Row is about a young Malcolm X before he becomes Malcolm X.
The Strivers' Row Spy by Jason Overstreet. Jason Overstreet's first novel is a historical fiction account of the Harlem Renaissance. Characters include Marcus Garvey, W. E. B. Du Bois, James Weldon Johnson, Adam Clayton Powell, among other historically significant figures.
In the conclusion of Colson Whitehead’s 2021 novel Harlem Shuffle, the protagonist, Ray Carney considers purchasing a place on Striver’s Row.
Striver's Row is mentioned as the home of a white murder victim in Law & Order: SVU  S10E18 "Baggage"

See also
List of New York City Landmarks
National Register of Historic Places listings in New York County, New York

References
Notes

Bibliography
 Time magazine, "Harlem: No Place Like Home" (July 31, 1964)
 Adams, Michael Henry. Harlem: Lost and Found Monacelli Press, 2002,

External links

African-American upper class
Colonial Revival architecture in New York City
Harlem
Historic districts on the National Register of Historic Places in Manhattan
New York City Designated Landmarks in Manhattan
New York City designated historic districts
Bruce Price buildings